An over–under or over/under (O/U) bet is a wager in which a sportsbook will predict a number for a statistic in a given game (usually the combined score of the two teams), and bettors wager that the actual number in the game will be either higher or lower than that number. For example, in Super Bowl XXXIX, most Las Vegas casinos set the over–under for the score of the game at 46.0.  A bettor could wager that the combined score of the two teams would be either more than or less than that number. Since the combined score of that game was 45, anyone who had bet on "under" won. The bet is called a push if the actual number exactly equals the over-under, in which case all bets are refunded.

Initial and final value
The goal of a sportsbook is to have an equal value of bets on both sides of the over–under. In theory, this means that the manager could set the value at zero and then re-adjust based on either the number of incoming bets or events that influence the potential outcome. In practice, the initial value is based on both quantitative information (e.g. win–loss record, average points per game, etc.) and anecdotal information (e.g. media reports, injury status of players, etc.).

As with other types of bets where the odds of either outcome are meant to be even, the vigorish (or "vig") is typically set at or about 5% of the total wager. Using American odds, this will result in both outcomes initially being quoted at -110 (i.e. bettors must risk $110 to win $100). If the amount bet on both outcomes is exactly even, using such odds would result in the sportsbook earning $5 in gross profit for every $110 wagered.

Bettors will not necessarily risk the same amount of money on both outcomes every time. In such circumstances, there are two ways a sportsbook can mitigate the risk. The first is to adjust the O/U while keeping the odds of both at -110. For example, if the O/U for a football game is set at 45.5 and the action heavily favors the "over" then the O/U could be adjusted to 46.5 to encourage bettors to take the "under." The risk here is that the sportsbook could lose a lot of money by being "middled" - using the aforementioned example, if the final combined score is 46 then the sportsbook would be obligated to pay both the initial bettors who bet "over" and the later bettors who bet "under."

The other method to mitigate risk is to adjust the odds on the initial O/U, which is slightly more complicated but eliminates the risk of being "middled." In the aforementioned example, the "under" could be adjusted to -105 while the "over" is changed to -115 (meaning bettors would have to risk $105 and $115 respectively to win $100) in order to make the original "under" proposition more attractive (and the "over" less so) to bettors. In actual scenarios, even adjustments of -100 (i.e. "even money") and -120 are common place as sportsbooks typically endeavor to maintain steady margins and minimize risk.

Statistics
Though this bet is most commonly made with the combined score of the two teams, many other statistics can be used, including:

 In American football, a player's or team's total rushing yards or attempts, down conversions (first or third), interceptions, completions, field goal percentage, etc.
 In basketball, a player's or team's total assists, blocks, turnovers, steals, etc.
 In baseball, a player's or team's total number of home runs, RBIs, etc.

Association football
Goal related markets in association football betting are gaining popularity amongst more and more bettors.  While match odds or 1X2 betting is still by far the most prominent football betting market, goal betting is second only to this market.

The overs unders 2.5 goals market is the most favoured amongst punters, with overs unders 0.5 attracting a lot of betting volume too.  Overs unders betting markets start at 0.5, and generally go right up to over under 7.5.

Looking at the over under 2.5 market, it means that within the standard 90 minutes, plus injury time.  The match will finish with over or under 2.5 goals.

Standard over unders goals betting markets are listed with a decimal place .5 because if a whole number were in use, in the popular under over 2.5 for instance.  The only market would be over or under 2 goals, missing out 2 goals score line results.

When a game is high scoring while the match is betting inplay, bookmakers and betting exchanges have been seen to add over under inplay football goals betting markets, right up to over and under 14.5 goals and more.

Back in 2017 the largest online sports betting exchange, The Betfair Exchange launched a new goal betting product, ‘goal lines’.  Goal lines allow punters access to the traditional overs unders markets, whilst also offering punters whole goal lines and quarter ball lines, similar to those used in asian handicap goal betting.

Dice
A variant of over-under betting, known as Under Over, is a dice game played at various festivals.  The object of the game is to predict whether the dice will roll to a total of under 7, over 7, or at 7. The game is typically played with 2 dice.

A player typically places a wager on one of three spaces.  These spaces are:

Under 7 (usually pays 1–1)
Over 7 (usually pays 1–1)
7 (usually pays 4–1)

For instance, if one bets one dollar on under and the dealer rolls under, they gain a dollar as well as get their dollar back. If the dealer rolls a seven and one bets on it, they make four dollars. Once all the bets have been placed the attendant closes the betting board with a screen and then puts the dice through the chute. Players then get paid accordingly.

One variation of Under Over involves foam dice, two of which are thrown in the middle of the players; in another variation, two balls are thrown into a giant wheel consisting of twelve spaces of numbers ranging from 1–6. No wire fence is used to block the bets in that case.

References

Wagering